The 2014–15 season was Torino Football Club's 104th season of competitive football, 87th season in the top division of Italian football and 70th season in Serie A.

Season overview

In the 2014–15 season Torino returned to one of the major European competitions after two decades, with a new starting line in attack: the club sold its attacking duo of the previous year, Alessio Cerci and Ciro Immobile, replacing them with Fabio Quagliarella (who grew up playing for Torino and returned after nine years) and Amauri. In the winter transfer window, Maxi López was added. The rest of the squad would see, primarily, the additions of Cristian Molinaro and Bruno Peres.

In Serie A, the team had a subdued start perhaps caused by the departure of the attack during the summer; in particular, the unfortunate loss in the derby on 30 November (1–2) at Juventus Stadium in injury time despite a numerical advantage and the goal of Peres, a coast to coast effort, running with the ball for 80 metres, which ended Torino's goal drought in the derby after 12 long years. After a turnaround in the league and 12 consecutive useful results obtained (thanks to the excellent performance of the central defender Kamil Glik), on 26 April 2015, Torino won the derby 2–1 against La Vecchia Signora for the first time in 20 years.

In Coppa Italia the Piedmont club came into play directly in the knockout stage and were immediately eliminated at the hands of Lazio (1–3). Torino were more successful in the Europa League, where the team qualified finishing second of their group, progressing to the round of 16 after eliminating Athletic Bilbao in the round of 32, achieving a 3–2 victory on 26 February at the San Mamés, a first for an Italian team in Bilbao. In the round of 16, Torino was eliminated the Russians of Zenit Saint Petersburg, failing to reverse the defeat in St. Petersburg in the first leg (0–2) with an irrelevant return home win (1–0).

Players

Squad information

Transfers

Summer 2014

In

Out

Winter 2014–15

In

Out

Pre-season and friendlies

Competitions

Overall

Serie A

League table

Results summary

Results by round

Matches

Coppa Italia

UEFA Europa League

Third qualifying round

Play-off round

Group stage

Knockout phase

Round of 32

Round of 16

Statistics

Appearances and goals

|-
! colspan="12" style="background:#dcdcdc; text-align:center"| Goalkeepers

|-
! colspan="12" style="background:#dcdcdc; text-align:center"| Defenders

|-
! colspan="12" style="background:#dcdcdc; text-align:center"| Midfielders

|-
! colspan="12" style="background:#dcdcdc; text-align:center"| Forwards

|-
! colspan="12" style="background:#dcdcdc; text-align:center"| Players transferred out during the season

References

Torino F.C. seasons
Torino
Torino